Big Stakes is a 1922 American silent Western film directed by Clifford S. Elfelt.

Plot
Texan Jim Gregory (J.B. Warner) heads south-of-the-border where he falls for senorita Mercedes Aloyez (Elinor Fair); but she is betrothed to the handsome El Capitán Montoya (R. Henry Grey).

Hometown girl Mary Moore's (Willie Mae Carson) purity is under threat from the leader of the local Ku Klux Klan.

A Mexican jumping-bean competition will determine who will win the senorita. Jim is declared the winner, but Mercedes prefers Montoya.

Jim heads back across the border and saves Mary from the clutches of Klan leader Bully Brand(Les Bates).

Cast
 J.B. Warner as Jim Gregory
 Elinor Fair as Señorita Mercedes Aloyez
 Les Bates as Bully Brand
 Willie Mae Carson as Mary Moore
 Hilliard Karr as Sidekick Skinny Fargo
 R. Henry Grey as El Capitán Montoya
 Ethelbert Knott as Pascal
 Louise Emmons as Mercedes Duena (uncredited)

Preservation status
A print of Big Stakes is preserved in the Library of Congress collection.

References

External links

 
 
 
 

1922 films
1922 Western (genre) films
American black-and-white films
Silent American Western (genre) films
1920s English-language films
1920s American films